Duke of Medina Sidonia is a peerage grandee title of Spain in Medina-Sidonia, holding the oldest extant dukedom in the kingdom, first awarded by King John II of Castile in 1380. They were once the most prominent magnate family of the Andalusian region, the best-known of whom, Don Alonso Pérez de Guzmán y Sotomayor, 7th Duke of Medina Sidonia, commanded the Spanish Armada at the end of the 16th century. The defeat at the hands of weather and the English in 1588 brought disgrace to this family. The House of Medina Sidonia traces its descent from Alonso Pérez de Guzmán.

Counts of Niebla, 1369–1445

Dukes of Medina Sidonia, 1445–present

See also
Almadraba – the concession on almadrabas (tuna traps along the Mediterranean coast) was one of the sources of the fortune of the Medina Sidonias
House of Olivares
House of Guzmán
House of Medina Sidonia

References

External links
Libro d'Oro della  Nobilita Mediterranea 
Grandes de Espana 
House of Medina Sidonia Foundation (in Spanish)
List of Arabic and Spanish names for Iberian cities and places
A Silent Minority: Deaf Education in Spain, 1550–1835
 Library of Congress: Index to the Enciclopedia Heráldica Hispano-Americana of Alberto and Arturo García Carraffa

 
Dukedoms of Spain
Grandees of Spain
Noble titles created in 1445